Järvepera is a village in Jõgeva Parish, Jõgeva County in Estonia. It is located just northeast of Palamuse, the administrative centre of the municipality, and southeast of Lake Kuremaa. Järvepera has a population of 31 (as of 1 January 2011).

The Amme River begins from the Lake Kuremaa in Järvepera.

Writer and playwright Oskar Luts (1887–1953) was born in the Posti farmstead in Järvepera. On 24 July 1966 a memorial stone was placed on the site where the house once was situated.

References

Villages in Jõgeva County